The IX Legislature of the National Assembly of São Tomé and Príncipe (Portuguese: IX Legislatura da Assembleia Nacional de São Tomé e Príncipe) was a legislature of the National Assembly of São Tomé and Príncipe. It officially began on 11 September 2010 and ended on 15 August 2014.

President: Evaristo Carvalho (until 26 November 2012), Alcino Martinho de Barros Pinto (from 28 November 2012)
Vice-President: Maria das Neves and José da Graça Diogo
Secretaries: Celmira Sacramento, Deolindo da Mata, Sebastião Pinheiro
Vice-Secretaries: Carlos Correia and Filomena dos Prazeres

Parliamentary groups

See also
São Tomé and Príncipe legislative election, 2010

References

2010 establishments in São Tomé and Príncipe
2014 disestablishments in São Tomé and Príncipe
Politics of São Tomé and Príncipe
Political organisations based in São Tomé and Príncipe